Tang Darreh (also known as Kamāl Maḩlleh) is a village in Gurab Pas Rural District, in the Central District of Fuman County, Gilan Province, Iran. At the 2006 census, its population was 681, in 173 families.

References 

Populated places in Fuman County